AC Mobil 34 is a small French aircraft manufacturer based in Saint-Florentin.  The firm produces a light aircraft in kitplane form.

List of Aircraft
AC Mobil 34 Chrysalin - Single-engine two-seat high-wing monoplane

References

Aircraft manufacturers of France
Companies based in Centre-Val de Loire